The 2021 Kate Sheppard Cup is New Zealand's women's 27th annual knockout football competition after the competition was cancelled, for the first time in its history, last season due to COVID-19. This is the fourth year that the competition is known by the Kate Sheppard Cup, or New Zealand Football Foundation Kate Sheppard Cup for sponsorship purposes, after previously been known as the Women's Knockout Cup since its establishment. The cup has had twelve different winners lift the trophy over its 27 year history with Lynn-Avon United from Auckland being the most successful and Eastern Suburbs being the current holders from the 2019 season.

The 2021 competition has four rounds before quarter-finals, semi-finals, and a final. Competition will run in four regions (northern, central/capital, mainland, southern) until the quarter-finals, from which stage the draw will be open. In all, a record 57 teams entered the competition this year which means the cup had a preliminary round added.

Results

Preliminary
All matches were played over the Anzac weekend of 23–26 April 2021. A full list of results are as follows:

Northern Region

Mainland Region

All teams listed below received byes to the first round.
Northern Region: Auckland United FC, Bucklands Beach AFC, Central United FC, Eastern Suburbs AFC, Ellerslie AFC, Onehunga Sports FC, Papakura City FC, Western Springs AFC, Birkenhead United AFC, Hibiscus Coast AFC, Northern Rovers FC, Northland United, West Auckland, West Coast Rangers FC, Claudelands Rovers SC, Hamilton Wanderers, Melville United AFC, Papamoa FC, Rotorua Utd AFC, Waikato Unicol AFC
Central/Capital Region: Palmerston North Marist FC, Massey University, New Plymouth Rangers AFC, Brooklyn Northern Utd AFC, Kapiti Coast Utd, Petone FC, Seatoun AFC, Upper Hutt City Football, Victoria University, Wairarapa United, Waterside Karori, Wellington United
Mainland Region: Cashmere Technical
Southern Region: Southland United FC, Queenstown AFC, Dunedin Technical AFC, Green Island AfC, Mosgiel AFC, Otago University AFC, Roslyn Wakari AFC

Round 1
All matches were played over the weekend of 15–16 May 2021. A full list of results are as follows:

Northern Region

Central/Capital Region

Mainland Region

Southern Region

All teams listed below received byes to the second round.
Northern Region: Waikato Unicol, Papakura City, Northern Rovers, Hamilton Wanderers, Western Springs, Ellerslie, Eastern Suburbs, Auckland United.
Central/Capital Region: Palmerston North Marist, Victoria University of Wellington, Wairarapa United, Waterside Karori.
Mainland Region: Richmond Athletic.
Southern Region: Mosgiel.

Round 2
All matches were played on Queen's Birthday weekend 5–7 June 2021. A full list of results are as follows:

Northern Region

Central/Capital Region

Mainland Region

Southern Region

Round 3
All matches were played on the weekend 18–20 June 2021 except for the game between Western Springs and Northern Rovers which was postponed due to floodlights going off before the game ended.

Northern Region

Central/Capital Region

Mainland

Southern Region

Quarter-finals
Three of the matches were played on the weekend 10–11 July 2021.

Northern Region

Central/Capital Region

Mainland/Southern Region

Semi-finals
Matches were meant to be played on the weekend 21–22 August 2021 however due to a COVID-19 outbreak and the country going into lockdown, the games were postponed.

Final
The final was to be played on the 8 September 2021 but due to delay of the semi-final games, it was pushed back to the 27 March 2022.

References

External links
Women's knockout cup section on the New Zealand Football website 

Women's Knockout Cup/Kate Sheppard Cup
Women's Knockout Cup
Women's Knockout Cup
New Zealand, Kate Sheppard Cup
New Zealand, Kate Sheppard Cup
Kate Sheppard Cup